The men's 200 metre backstroke competition at the 2010 Pan Pacific Swimming Championships took place on August 20 at the William Woollett Jr. Aquatics Center.  The last champion was Aaron Peirsol of US.

This race consisted of four lengths of the pool, all in backstroke.

Records
Prior to this competition, the existing world and Pan Pacific records were as follows:

Results
All times are in minutes and seconds.

Heats
The first round was held on August 20, at 11:31.

B Final 
The B final was held on August 20, at 19:25.

A Final 
The A final was held on August 20, at 19:25.

References

2010 Pan Pacific Swimming Championships